Telipogon is a genus of flowering plants from the orchid family, Orchidaceae. It is a large genus with dozens of species, native to South America, Central America, Hispaniola and southern Mexico.

Species 

 Telipogon acicularis  (Dressler) N.H.Williams & Dressler 2005
 Telipogon albertii  Rchb.f. (1876
 Telipogon alegriae  D.E.Benn. & Christenson 2001
 Telipogon alexii  N.H.Williams & Dressler 2005
 Telipogon alticola  (Dodson & R.Escobar) N.H.Williams & Dressler 2005
 Telipogon ampliflorus  C.Schweinf. 1938
 Telipogon anacristinae  (Pupulin) N.H.Williams & Dressler 2005
 Telipogon andicola  Rchb.f. 1855
 Telipogon andreetae  Dodson & Hirtz 2004
 Telipogon antioquianus  Rchb.f. 1876
 Telipogon antonietae  D.E.Benn. & Ric.Fernández 1992
 Telipogon ardeltianus  Braas 1981
 Telipogon ariasii  Dodson & D.E.Benn. 1989
 Telipogon astroglossus  Rchb.f. 1854
 Telipogon asuayanus  Rchb.f. 1876
 Telipogon atropurpurea  D.E.Benn. & Ric.Fernández 1992
 Telipogon aureus  Lindl. 1845
 Telipogon auriculatus  D.E.Benn. & Christenson 2001
 Telipogon auritus  Rchb.f. 1876
 Telipogon australis  Dodson & Hirtz 2004
 Telipogon ballesteroi  Dodson & R.Escobar 1987
 Telipogon barbozae  (J.T.Atwood & Dressler) N.H.Williams & Dressler 2005
 Telipogon benedicti  Rchb.f. 1876
 Telipogon bennettii  (Dodson & R.Escobar) N.H.Williams & Dressler 2005
 Telipogon bergoldii  (Garay & Dunst.) Senghas & Lückel 1994
 Telipogon berthae  P.Ortiz 1994
 Telipogon biolleyi  Schltr. 1911
 Telipogon boissierianus  Rchb.f. 1856
 Telipogon boliviensis  (R.Vásquez & Dodson) N.H.Williams & Dressler 2005
 Telipogon bombiformis  Dressler 2003
 Telipogon bowmanii  Rchb.f. 1876
 Telipogon boylei  (J.T.Atwood) N.H.Williams & Dressler 2005
 Telipogon bullpenensis  (J.T.Atwood) N.H.Williams & Dressler 2005
 Telipogon butcheri  Dodson & R.Escobar 1993
 Telipogon butchii  N.H.Williams & Dressler 2005
 Telipogon calueri  N.H.Williams & Dressler 2005
 Telipogon campbelliorum  (J.T.Atwood) N.H.Williams & Dressler 2005.
 Telipogon campoverdei  D.E.Benn. & Ric.Fernández 1992
 Telipogon caroliae  Dodson & R.Escobar 1987
 Telipogon cascajalensis  Dodson & R.Escobar 1987
 Telipogon caucanus  Schltr. 1920
 Telipogon caulescens  Dressler 2003
 Telipogon chiriquensis  Dodson & R.Escobar 1993
 Telipogon christobalensis  Kraenzl. 1920
 Telipogon chrysocrates  Rchb.f. 1876
 Telipogon collantesii  D.E.Benn. & Christenson 2001
 Telipogon costaricensis  Schltr. 1911
 Telipogon cuscoensis  Nauray & Christenson 2003
 Telipogon cuyujensis  Dodson 1989
 Telipogon dalstromii  Dodson 1984
 Telipogon davidsonii  D.E.Benn. & Christenson 2001
 Telipogon dendriticus  Rchb.f. 1878
 Telipogon distantiflorus  (Ames & C.Schweinf.) N.H.Williams & Dressler 2005.
 Telipogon dodsonii  Braas 1985
 Telipogon dubius  Rchb.f. 1876
 Telipogon eberhardtii  Braas 1985
 Telipogon ecuadorensis  Schltr. 1921
 Telipogon elcimeyae  Braas & Horich 1982
 Telipogon embreei  N.H.Williams & Dressler 2005.
 Telipogon erratus  (Dressler) N.H.Williams & Dressler 2005.
 Telipogon falcatus  Linden & Rchb.f. 1854
 Telipogon fortunae  (Dressler) N.H.Williams & Dressler 2005.
 Telipogon fritillum  Rchb.f. & Warsz. 1854
 Telipogon frymirei  Dodson 1984
 Telipogon genegeorgei  D.E.Benn. & Ric.Fernández 1992
 Telipogon glicensteinii  Dodson & R.Escobar 1987
 Telipogon gnomus  Schltr. 1921
 Telipogon gracilipes  Schltr. 1923
 Telipogon gracilis  Schltr. 1920
 Telipogon griesbeckii  Dressler 2003
 Telipogon guacamayensis  Dodson & R.Escobar 1989
 Telipogon guila  Dodson & R.Escobar 1987
 Telipogon gymnostele  Rchb.f. 1876
 Telipogon hagsateri  Dodson & R.Escobar 1993
 Telipogon hartwegii  Rchb.f. 1878
 Telipogon hastatus  Rchb.f. 1876
 Telipogon hauschildianus  Braas 1982
 Telipogon hausmannianus  Rchb.f. 1861
 Telipogon helleri  (L.O.Williams) N.H.Williams & Dressler 2005.
 Telipogon hemimelas  Rchb.f. 1876
 Telipogon hercules  Rchb.f. ex Kraenzl. 1920
 Telipogon hirtzii  Dodson & R.Escobar 1989
 Telipogon hoppii  Schltr. 1924
 Telipogon hutchisonii  Dodson & D.E.Benn. 1989
 Telipogon hystrix  (Dodson) N.H.Williams & Dressler 2005.
 Telipogon ibischii  (R.Vásquez) N.H.Williams & Dressler 2005.
 Telipogon immaculatus  Christenson 2001
 Telipogon intis  Braas 1981
 Telipogon ionopogon  Rchb.f. 1876
 Telipogon isabelae  Dodson & Hirtz 2004
 Telipogon jimburensis  Dodson & R.Escobar 1989
 Telipogon jostii  (Dodson) N.H.Williams & Dressler 2005.
 Telipogon jucusbambae  Dodson & R.Escobar 1998
 Telipogon kalbreyerianus  Kraenzl. 1920
 Telipogon karsteae  Dodson & Ed.Sánchez 2004
 Telipogon klotzscheanus  Rchb.f. 1850
 Telipogon lagunae  Schltr. 1924
 Telipogon lankesteri  Ames 1923
 Telipogon latifolius  Kunth in F.W.H.von Humboldt 1816
 Telipogon lehmannii  Schltr. 1920
 Telipogon leila-alexandrae  Braas 1985
 Telipogon loxensis  Dodson & Hirtz 2004
 Telipogon lueri  Dodson & D.E.Benn. 1989
 Telipogon machupicchuensis  Nauray & Christenson 2003
 Telipogon macroglottis  Rchb.f. 1876
 Telipogon maduroi  Dressler 2003
 Telipogon maldonadoensis  Dodson & R.Escobar 1998
 Telipogon medusae  Dressler 2006
 Telipogon mendiolae  Dodson & D.E.Benn. 1989
 Telipogon microglossus  (Schltr.) N.H.Williams & Dressler 2005.
 Telipogon minutiflorus  Kraenzl. 1920
 Telipogon monteverdensis  (J.T.Atwood) N.H.Williams & Dressler 2005.
 Telipogon monticola  L.O.Williams 1970
 Telipogon morganiae  (Dodson) N.H.Williams & Dressler 2005.
 Telipogon morii  (Dressler) N.H.Williams & Dressler 2005.
 Telipogon musaicus  Rchb.f. 1876
 Telipogon nervosus  (L.) Druce 1917
 Telipogon nirii  Ackerman 2004
 Telipogon nitens  Rchb.f. 1876
 Telipogon obovatus  Lindl. 1847
 Telipogon ochraceus  Garay 1956
 Telipogon octavioi  Dodson & R.Escobar 1993
 Telipogon olmosii  Dressler 2006
 Telipogon ortizii  Dodson & R.Escobar 1993
 Telipogon ospinae  Dodson & R.Escobar 1993
 Telipogon pachensis  Rchb.f. 1876
 Telipogon pampatamboensis  (Dodson & R.Vásquez) N.H.Williams & Dressler 2005.
 Telipogon pamplonensis  Rchb.f. 1858
 Telipogon panamensis  Dodson & R.Escobar 1993
 Telipogon papilio  Rchb.f. & Warsz. 1854
 Telipogon parvulus  C.Schweinf. 1937
 Telipogon pastoanus  Schltr. 1920
 Telipogon patinii  Rchb.f. 1876
 Telipogon penningtonii  Dodson & R.Escobar 1989
 Telipogon perlobatus  (Senghas) N.H.Williams & Dressler 2005.
 Telipogon personatus  Dressler 2006
 Telipogon peruvianus  T.Hashim. 1990
 Telipogon pfavii  Schltr. 1921
 Telipogon phalaena  Rchb.f. ex Kraenzl. 1920
 Telipogon phalaenopsis  Braas 1981
 Telipogon piyacnuensis  D.E.Benn. & Christenson 2001
 Telipogon pogonostalix  Rchb.f. 1876
 Telipogon polymerus  Rchb.f. 1876
 Telipogon polyneuros  Rchb.f. ex Kraenzl. 1920
 Telipogon polyrrhizus  Rchb.f. 1878
 Telipogon portillae  Christenson 2003
 Telipogon portilloi  Dodson & R.Escobar 1987
 Telipogon pseudobulbosus  (D.E.Benn. & Christenson) N.H.Williams & Dressler 2005.
 Telipogon pulcher  Rchb.f. 1876
 Telipogon puruantensis  Dodson & R.Escobar 1998
 Telipogon putumayensis  Dodson & R.Escobar 1993
 Telipogon radiatus  Rchb.f. 1876
 Telipogon retanarum  Dodson & R.Escobar 1987
 Telipogon reventadorensis  N.H.Williams & Dressler 2005.
 Telipogon rhombipetalus  C.Schweinf. 1946
 Telipogon roberti  N.H.Williams & Dressler 2005.
 Telipogon roseus  Garay 1956
 Telipogon salinasiae  Farfán & Moretz 2003
 Telipogon sanchezii  Dodson & Hirtz 2004
 Telipogon saraguroensis  Dodson & Ed.Sánchez 2004
 Telipogon sayakoae  D.E.Benn. & Christenson  2000
 Telipogon schmidtchenii  Rchb.f. ex Kraenzl. 1920
 Telipogon seibertii  Dodson & R.Escobar 1993
 Telipogon selbyanus  N.H.Williams & Dressler 2005.
 Telipogon semipictus  Rchb.f. ex Kraenzl. 1920
 Telipogon setosus  Ames 1938
 Telipogon smaragdinus  (Pupulin & M.A.Blanco) N.H.Williams & Dressler 2005.
 Telipogon standleyi  Ames 1925
 Telipogon steinii  Dodson & R.Escobar 1989
 Telipogon steyermarkii  Foldats 1968
 Telipogon stinae  Dodson & Dalström 1984
 Telipogon storkii  Ames & C.Schweinf. 1930
 Telipogon suarezii  D.E.Benn. & Christenson 2001
 Telipogon suffusus  Rchb.f. ex Kraenzl. 1920
 Telipogon tabanensis  Dodson & R.Escobar 1993
 Telipogon tamboensis  Dodson & Hirtz 2004
 Telipogon tayacajaensis  D.E.Benn. & Christenson 2001
 Telipogon tesselatus  Lindl. in G.Bentham 1845
 Telipogon thomasii  Dodson & R.Escobar 1989
 Telipogon tsipiriensis  (Pupulin) N.H.Williams & Dressler 2005.
 Telipogon tungurahuae  Dodson & R.Escobar 1998
 Telipogon urceolatus  C.Schweinf. 1947
 Telipogon valenciae  Dodson & R.Escobar 1993
 Telipogon vampyrus  Braas & Horich 1982
 Telipogon vasquezii  Dodson 1984
 Telipogon venustus  Schltr. 1920
 Telipogon vieirae  Dodson & R.Escobar 1993
 Telipogon vollesii  Dodson & R.Escobar 1993
 Telipogon vulcanicus  Dodson & Hirtz 2004
 Telipogon wallisii  Rchb.f. 1876
 Telipogon zephyrinus  Rchb.f. 1876

See also 
 List of Orchidaceae genera

References 

  2005. Handbuch der Orchideen-Namen. Dictionary of Orchid Names. Dizionario dei nomi delle orchidee. Ulmer, Stuttgart
  (2009). Epidendroideae (Part two). Genera Orchidacearum 5: 362 ff. Oxford University Press.

External links 

Oncidiinae genera
Oncidiinae